Scott Reider is an American gasser drag racer.

Driving a Chevrolet-powered 1932 Ford, he won NHRA's B/SR (B/Street; gas) national title at the NHRA Nationals, held at Indianapolis Raceway Park, in 1962.

The next year, he won a second NHRA B/SR national title, at Indianapolis, in the Reider & Weiler Deuce. He also won Gas Junior Eliminator at Indianapolis in 1963.

References

Sources
Davis, Larry. Gasser Wars.  North Branch, MN:  Cartech, 2003, pp. 181–2.

Dragster drivers
American racing drivers